Alagoa may refer to:

Places
Brazil:
Alagoas, a northeastern state
Alagoa, Minas Gerais
Alagoa Grande, Paraíba
Alagoa Nova, Paraíba
Conceição das Alagoas, Minas Gerais
Estrela de Alagoas, Alagoas

Portugal:
Alagoa, Portalegre